Sacred Heart Church is an historic church building in Portland, Maine owned by the Roman Catholic Diocese of Portland.

History

Built between 1896 and 1915, it was designed in the Renaissance Revival style by architects Francis H. Fassett and Edward F. Fassett. It is modeled after the Marseille's Notre-Dame de la Garde basilica and was Francis Fassett's final commission before his 1906 death. Upon completion it became the city's third Catholic parish. Bishop James Augustine Healy appointed Irish-born Father John O'Dowd as its first pastor. The building's first mass was held on April 4, 1897.

In 1997, the Diocese closed nearby St. Dominic's Church and merged the parish into Sacred Heart to form the Sacred Heart/St. Dominic Parish.

Located in Portland's densely-built and primarily working-class residential Parkside neighborhood, the Church was founded to serve the city's large Irish-American population. However, by the 2000s, the parish has grown to include a significant population of immigrants, refugees, and asylum seekers from sub-Saharan Africa and Central America.

Renovations
In 1999, $793,000 was raised to repair the roof and stone exterior; this work was completed in 2001. Further renovations were completed in early 2005.

In 2013, a $200,000 capital campaign began to raise funds to restore the church's bell tower, repair its bell, and repaint the window sashes. However, when renovations began, engineers  discovered that more money was needed to repair the roof over the altar. In 2015, local historic preservation organization Greater Portland Landmarks placed Sacred Heart on its "Places in Peril" due to years of deferred maintenance and repairs and urged its supporters to help fund renovations.

References
 

Irish-American culture in Maine
Churches in the Roman Catholic Diocese of Portland
Roman Catholic churches completed in 1915
1896 establishments in Maine
Churches in Portland, Maine
20th-century Roman Catholic church buildings in the United States